Hazratpour is a surname. Notable people with the surname include:

Mohammad Hazratpour (born 1982), Iranian politician
Mohammadreza Hazratpour (born 1999), Iranian volleyball player
Ruhollah Hazratpour (born 1984), Iranian politician, nephew and son-in-law of Mohammad